Central Plaza or Plaza Central (Spanish for "Central Square"), may refer to:

 Central Plaza (Dublin), formerly headquarters of the Central Bank of Ireland
 Central Plaza (Hong Kong), a skyscraper in Hong Kong, China
 Central Plaza (Oklahoma), a shopping mall in Lawton, Texas, United States
 Central Plaza (San Francisco), a skyscraper in San Francisco, United States
 Plaza Central (Texas), a shopping mall in Arlington, Texas, United States
 Central Plaza Complex, in Brisbane, Queensland, Australia
 Plaza Central, former name of Parque Vidal in Santa Clara, Cuba